Megachile albonotata is a bee species in the genus Megachile; found notably in Spain, it is the pollinator of the orchid Ophrys drumana.

References

External links 
 Megachile albonotata at www.gbif.org
 Photo at flickr.com

albonotata
Insects described in 1886
Hymenoptera of Europe
Orchid pollinators